Ariotus is a genus of ant-like leaf beetles in the family Aderidae. There are at least four described species in Ariotus.

Species
These four species belong to the genus Ariotus:
 Ariotus luteolus (Casey, 1895)
 Ariotus pruinosus (Casey, 1895)
 Ariotus quercicola (Schwarz, 1878)
 Ariotus subtropicus Casey, 1895

References

Further reading

 
 
 
 
 
 

Aderidae
Articles created by Qbugbot